The first season of the NBC American supernatural drama series Grimm premiered on October 28, 2011, and concluded on May 18, 2012. It consisted of 22 episodes. The series, created by David Greenwalt, Jim Kouf and Stephen Carpenter, follows the last known descendant of the Grimm line, Nick Burkhardt, as he deals with being a cop, and trying not to expose his secret as a Grimm.

Cast

Main cast
 David Giuntoli as Nick Burkhardt
 Russell Hornsby as Hank Griffin
 Bitsie Tulloch as Juliette Silverton
 Silas Weir Mitchell as Monroe
 Sasha Roiz as Captain Sean Renard
 Reggie Lee as Sergeant Drew Wu

Recurring cast
 Claire Coffee as Adalind Schade
Sharon Sachs as Dr. Harper
 Bree Turner as Rosalee Calvert
Danny Bruno as Bud
 Kate Burton as Marie Kessler
 Jessica Tuck as Catherine Schade
 Mary Elizabeth Mastrantonio as Kelly Burkhardt

Episodes

Ratings

DVD release

References

2011 American television seasons
2012 American television seasons
Season 1